Townhall is an American politically conservative website, print magazine and radio news service. Previously published by The Heritage Foundation, it is now owned and operated by Salem Communications. The website features more than 80 columns (both syndicated and exclusive) by a variety of writers and commentators.  The website also publishes news articles from the Associated Press.

Townhall also provides five minute radio newscasts around the clock, detailing national and world news items.  These newscasts air at the beginning of each hour on many Salem-owned radio stations and on Salem Radio Network affiliates, as well as on Sirius XM Patriot Channel 125.

History
Townhall was founded on March 2, 1995 as one of the first conservative internet communities. In 2005, Townhall.com split off from The Heritage Foundation.

In May 2006, Salem Communications acquired Townhall.com and relaunched the site with the addition of podcasts of Salem's network and local talk shows, blogs run by Salem talk show hosts and the ability for any user to set up a blog on the Townhall.com network. The website provides an extensive selection of opinion columns and news items presented from a conservative viewpoint.

In January 2008, Townhall.com launched Townhall Magazine, a monthly conservative news magazine. In addition to exclusive content for the magazine, Townhall Magazine carries contributions from Townhall.com readers.

In February 2011, Townhall.com re-launched TownhallFinance.com, a daily financial and investment site dedicated to conservative financial commentary, under the editorship of John Ransom. In 2018, Jerry Bowyer became editor of the site. It carries commentary from Ransom and Fox Business Network analyst Charles Payne, and carried CNBC's Larry Kudlow before Kudlow went on leave to become head of the former President's Council of Economic Advisors and then went on to host his own show on Fox Business Network in February 2021.

Columnists 
Townhall.com features commentary by various conservative columnists and guest commentary by politicians. Guest contributors have included Eric Trump, Donald Trump Jr., and Lara Trump.

Reception 
In November 2021, a study by the Center for Countering Digital Hate described Townhall as being among "ten fringe publishers" that together were responsible for nearly 70 percent of Facebook user interactions with content that denied climate change. Facebook disputed the study's methodology.

References

External links 
 

The Heritage Foundation
American political blogs
Digital mass media companies
Internet properties established in 1995
Salem Media Group properties
American conservative websites
Climate change denial